Avramović is a Serbian surname derived from a masculine given name Avram, and may refer to:

Aleksa Avramović, (born 1994), Serbian basketball player
Aleksandra Avramović (born 1982), Serbian volleyball player
Dimitrije Avramović (1815–1855), Serbian painter
Dragoljub Avramović (born 1979), Serbian basketball coach
Dragoslav Avramović (1919–2001), Serbian economist
Ivica Avramović (born 1976), Serbian footballer
Marko Avramović (born 1986), Serbian water polo player
Marko Avramović (born 1987), Serbian footballer
Miguel Avramovic (born 1981), Argentine rugby union footballer
Radojko Avramović (born 1949), football coach
Saša Avramović (born 1993), Serbian basketball player
Sima Avramović (born 1950), Serbian legal academic

As a patronym: Avramovich is a patronym for the Hebrew name Avram.

See also
Avramov

Serbian surnames